The Philippine Science Consortium (PSC), formerly Luzon Science Consortium, was organized by the founding member institutions namely Central Luzon State University (CLSU), Cagayan State University (CSU), and Isabela State University (ISU), known as CLSU-CSU-ISU Science Consortium, on September 17, 1982. The prime objective of the consortium was to improve science education in Luzon upon the advice of the Science Education Institute of the Department of Science and Technology (DOST) under the Institution Building Program (IBP) of then National Science and Technology Authority (NSTA) - Science Promotion Institute. 

In 1991, Nueva Viscaya State Institute of Technology (NVSIT), Nueva Viscaya State Polytechnic College (NVSPC), and Quirino State College (QSC) joined the consortium. In the same year, the presidents and representatives from the six member institutions formally changed the name to Luzon Science Consortium, also referred to as LSC. The Luzon Science Consortium since then promotes science education among the students and faculty of state universities and colleges in regions I, II, III, and IV in Luzon. With increasing number of members throughout the Philippines, it was changed to Philippine Science Consortium (PSC).

The mission statement of PSC is "With adherence to the PSC Vision, the Philippine Science Consortium shall sustain and maintain quality education in Mathematics, Breeder Sciences and Technology among the State Universities and Colleges (SUCs) member as well as other institutions of higher learning in Luzon."

Administration
The management of the Philippine Science Consortium is vested in the PSC Council headed by an elected chair who serves for one year. The chair is rotated among the presidents of the regular member institutions. The elected vice-chair of the council automatically assumes the chairmanship of the council. In 2012, the National Federated Student Council (NFSC) was created.

2013
PSC Chair: Dr. Max P. Guillermo of Tarlac College of Agriculture
PSC NFSC President: Wilbert John Ross Tabangin of University of Northern Philippines

2014
PSC Chair: Dr. Nora L. Magnaye of Batangas State University
PSC NFSC President: Joey Espino of Batangas State University

Member institutions
 Abra State Institute of Science and Technology (ASIST)
 Aurora State College of Technology (ASCOT)
 Bataan Peninsula State University (BPSU)
 Batangas State University (BatSU)
 Benguet State University (BengSU)
 Bulacan Agricultural State College (BASC)
 Bulacan State University (BulSU)
 Central Luzon State University (CLSU)
 Cagayan State University (CSU)
 Cavite State University (CvSU)
 Don Honorio Ventura Technological State University (DHVTSU)
 Don Mariano Marcos Memorial State University (DMMMSU)
 Isabela State University (ISU)
 Ifugao State University (IFSU)
 Ilocos Sur Polytechnic State College (ISPSC)
 Kalinga State University(KSU)
 Laguna State Polytechnic University (LSPU)
 Marinduque State University (MSU)
 Mariano Marcos State University(MMSU)
 Mindoro State College of Agriculture and Technology (MinSCAT)
 Misamis Oriental State College of Agriculture and Technology(MOSCAT)
 Nueva Ecija University of Science and Technology (NEUST)
 Nueva Vizcaya State University (NVSU)
 Occidental Mindoro State College(OMSC)
 Palawan State University(PalSU)
 Pampanga State Agricultural University (PSAU)
 Pangasinan State University (PSU)
 Philippine Merchant Marine Academy (PMMA)
 Quirino State College (QSC)
 President Ramon Magsaysay State University (PRMSU)
 Romblon State University (RSU)
 Southern Luzon State University (SLSU)
 Tarlac College of Agriculture (TCA)
 Tarlac State University (TSU)
 Technological University of the Philippines (TUP)
 University of Northern Philippines (UNP)
 University of Rizal System(URS)
 Department of Science and Technology (DOST)

References

Higher education in the Philippines